Nightwalking (also known as Night Walking) is a 2008 British comedy horror short film directed by Daniel Cormack, starring Raquel Cassidy and Lloyd Woolf.

In 2010, Nightwalking was selected for preservation by the British Film Institute's National Archive and was archived by the British Universities Film and Video Council as part of their Television and Radio Index for Learning and Teaching (TRILT).  In 2012, the film was acquired by the British Library's Moving Image Collection.

Plot

Returning from a night out, Martha (Raquel Cassidy) hears footsteps behind her and becomes convinced she's being followed as she walks down a dark path on her way home. She ponders various strategies such as pretending to do up her shoes in order to let her follower overtake her or simply running away, but dismisses each idea as endangering her even more. Eventually she screws up her courage to turn around and confront the man behind her, but when she does so she sees nothing except a mobile phone glowing on the ground as it calls somebody. James (Lloyd Woolf), her follower, has actually been going out of his way to avoid the impression he is following her or is a threat, but every time he does so it somehow backfires. He tries speeding up to overtake her, but this only makes Martha walk faster. He ponders taking a different route, but there are no turnings off the path they are walking down. Eventually he decides to make a "loud non-threatening phone call" to his mum, reasoning that: "I bet rapists never call their mums."  However, as he is distracted with finding her number in his phone, he fails to notice a manhole in the ground and falls head over heels into it, his phone flying to the ground near Martha's feet.

Release

Nightwalking was originally released online as part of the inaugural Virgin Media Shorts Competition in 2008.  It quickly became the most viewed film attracting over 12,300 views and hundreds of comments.  The judges initially shortlisted the film for the Grand Prize. However, when the film came to be classified by the British Board of Film Classification it was given a 12a certificate, thus disqualifying it from the competition, which required that the 12 shortlisted films were certified as a PG or U.

Festivals

Broadcast

In 2010, Nightwalking was broadcast on Channel 4 as part of "a series of short original films produced by a variety of talented writers and directors"; the first time in over 8 years that Channel 4 had acquired and broadcast independent short films.

Reception

Accolades

Nightwalking has a rating of 6.8 out of 10 from IMDb's top 1,000 voters.

See also 

 Amelia and Michael
 A Fitting Tribute
 Make Me a Tory

References

External links 
 Actaeon Films Official Production Company website
 Network Ireland Television Official Distributor website
 Nightwalking at the BBC Film Network
 Nightwalking at the British Council British Films Directory
 
 Nightwalking at the Complete Index to World Film
 

2008 films
2008 short films
British independent films
British drama short films
British comedy-drama films
2000s English-language films
2000s British films